Anne Marie Kortright (born March 14, 1982) is a Puerto Rican fashion model.

Career
Kortright was born in Nuremberg, Germany where her father was serving in the U.S. Army. Her parents are originally from Puerto Rico. She has been featured in advertisement campaigns for the likes of Bobbi Brown, Levi Strauss & Co., and Swatch. She has also been pictured on the covers of magazines such as Latina and Shape, and appeared in Vogue (Paris) and Maxim.  She ranked #50 on Maxim's Hot 100 list for 2003.  She has also appeared in DVDs released by Maxim.

References

1982 births
Living people
Puerto Rican female models
German emigrants to Puerto Rico
21st-century American women